Jews Don't Count is a nonfiction polemic by David Baddiel, published on 4 February 2021, which attacks the ignorance of antisemitism by modern-day progressives compared to other forms of discrimination. The book is centred on various examples of antisemitism in popular and social media, as well as justifications of modern-day antisemitism. Baddiel, an atheist British Jew, argues that Jews are not seen as a proper minority group, and he also argues that there exists a hierarchy of racisms, which excludes antisemitism.

Synopsis 
In the book's opening, Baddiel gives several examples of antisemitism being glossed over in various industries, especially the literary and film industries, as well as political antisemitism. Baddiel also describes  racism in football in detail, mentioning the use of the term "Yid" by Tottenham Hotspur fans. Baddiel argues that antisemitism has become a 'second class racism' (p. 11), and he writes about the antisemitism which is manifesting itself as an underrepresentation of ethnic Jews. Baddiel then proceeds to address several arguments for this underrepresentation, such as the belief that Jews are not an oppressed group due to their stereotype of being wealthy. Baddiel also addresses the idea of Jews having white privilege, which supposedly allows a safety against racism.

Baddiel then discusses the acceptance in the film industry of casting Gentiles as Jewish characters, and the anti-Jewish impressions in which actors can represent Jews, including an abundance of stereotypes. Baddiel also notes the modern tendency for actors to hide their Jewish heritages, which is rarely seen in any other ethnic minority. Baddiel also briefly discusses the subtleties of the word "Jew" as a pejorative, and argues that antisemitism is racism.

Baddiel then continues in a semi-autobiographical manner to consider his relationship with Israel as a non-Zionist, and how expectations of a non-Israeli Jew to be a Zionist is a form of antisemitism. He also considers that guilt for the actions of Israel by Western left-wing Jews is in fact a form of internalized racism, fueled by mass media.

To conclude the book, Baddiel reflects on the improvement in attitudes towards Jews through recent years, although he remains steadfast in his view that Jews are being marginalised.

Reception 
Jews Don't Count received on the whole positive reviews, with several Jewish organisations praising the book, including the Britain Israel Communications and Research Centre and the Jewish Book Council. The book was appreciated by the media;  The Times chose the book as its Politics Book of the Year 2021. The Sunday Times also included the book among its "best paperbacks of 2022" list. The book furthermore attracted praise from celebrities, with Stephen Fry describing the book as a "a masterpiece".

Documentary 
On 17 May 2022, Channel 4 announced intentions to create a documentary adaptation of the book, entitled David Baddiel: Jews Don't Count to be produced by Mindhouse Productions.  The documentary was directed by James Routh and had Louis Theroux as a executive producer. The documentary aired on 21 November 2022.

The documentary features a series of interviews by Baddiel with other notable Jewish figures, including Stephen Fry, David Schwimmer, Miriam Margolyes and Neil Gaiman. Baddiel discusses Jewish identity, Antisemitism in the United Kingdom, as well as discrimination against Black Jews. Interviewing Sarah Silverman, Jewface is mentioned, especially the casting of non Jewish actors to play Jewish characters.

Baddiel has stated that the documentary was aimed at non-Jews, to raise awareness of antisemitism.  Baddiel was widely praised for the documentary, with Haaretz naming him a "Voice for British Jews". The documentary received mostly positive reviews with The Guardian calling it "a doc so shocking it sounds like a siren". The Telegraph described the book as "well-argued, but not entirely well-balanced", highlighting Baddiel's bias in the book.

Publications 
The original hardback and ebook versions were released on 4 February 2021.  A second edition was late released on 2 February 2022, nearly exactly a year after the debut of the original. A Portuguese translation was published in April 2022 by Vogais, under the title Os Judeus Não Contam.

References 

2021 non-fiction books
Books about antisemitism
New antisemitism